Vincetoxicum hainanense is a species of plants in the Apocynaceae. It was first described in 1941 as Merrillanthus hainanensis, which was the only species in the genus Merrillanthus.

It is native to Guangdong, Hainan, and Cambodia

References

Flora of China
Flora of Cambodia
hainanense